Michael Joseph Coteau  is a Canadian politician who serves as the Member of Parliament for Don Valley East in the House of Commons of Canada. From 2011 to 2021, he was a Liberal member of the Legislative Assembly of Ontario representing the provincial district of Don Valley East in Toronto. He served in the Cabinet of Ontario under Premier Kathleen Wynne from 2013 to 2018 in several portfolios, including Citizenship and Immigration, Tourism, Culture and Sport and Community and Social Services. After the 2018 Ontario general election, Coteau was one of seven Liberals re-elected, and he subsequently ran in the 2020 Ontario Liberal Party leadership election, placing second with 16.9% of the vote.

Coteau resigned as from the Legislative Assembly of Ontario on August 17, 2021 to run for his constituency's federal seat, vacated by Yasmin Ratansi, in the 44th Canadian general election. He was elected with 59% of the vote.

Background
Coteau was born in Huddersfield, England. His father is from Carriacou, Grenada and his mother is from Yorkshire, England. He came to Canada with his parents in 1976 and grew up in social housing in Flemingdon Park in North York. Coteau's family was low-income and he had to borrow the money needed to cover his university application fee from a friend's father. He attended Carleton University and graduated with a degree in history and political science.

After graduation, he taught English in South Korea.

Career
Coteau was a Toronto District School Board Trustee for Ward 17, winning elections in 2003, 2006, and 2010. As a trustee, he advocated for student nutrition, community use of space, and the use of educational technology. He initiated the 'Community Use of Schools' motion that cut user fees and made schools more accessible to groups that offer programs for children. He helped introduce nutritional changes in schools that supported healthy food programs and increased awareness of student hunger.
In addition to his work as a trustee, Coteau served as the executive director and chief executive officer of a national adult literacy firm, and worked as a community organizer in the Malvern area of Scarborough, Ontario with the United Way. He also owned and operated his own small business.

Provincial politics
In 2011 he ran provincial election in the riding of Don Valley East. He won the election beating PC candidate Michael Lende by 7,645 votes. He was re-elected in 2014.

The Liberals won a minority government and Coteau was appointed as parliamentary assistant to the minister of tourism and culture. In 2013, after Kathleen Wynne replaced Dalton McGuinty as premier, Coteau was named Minister of Citizenship and Immigration. He was one of ten members of the Wynne's cabinet with no prior cabinet experience. In June 2014, Coteau was made Minister of Tourism, Culture and Sport by Premier Kathleen Wynne, as well as Minister Responsible for the 2015 Pan and Parapan American Games. He made headlines advocating for children to be able to play street hockey. On February 16, 2016, it was announced that Coteau would add responsibility for anti-racism, responsible for establishing various anti-racism programs.  On June 13, 2016, he was appointed Minister of Children and Youth Services, and in particular worked collaboratively with parents to deliver a reformed Ontario Autism Program. He also was subsequently appointed Minister of Community and Social Services, holding down three separate portfolios for the government.

In 2018, Coteau defeated Conservative candidate Denzil Minnan Wong, Toronto's deputy mayor, to win his third election in the North Toronto constituency.

In June 2019, Coteau entered the race for leadership of the Ontario Liberal Party. Coteau said he had "a different vision" and would "restore decency to our politics". At the leadership convention on March 7, 2020, he received 16.9% of the vote, finishing second behind the winner, Steven Del Duca.

Federal Politics
On August 10, 2021, Coteau was nominated as the Liberal Party of Canada candidate in Don Valley East, ahead of the next Canadian Federal Election. He was elected on September 20, 2021.

Cabinet positions

Electoral record

References

Notes

Citations

External links

1972 births
21st-century Canadian politicians
Black Canadian politicians
Canadian people of Grenadian descent
Canadian schoolteachers
Carleton University alumni
English emigrants to Canada
Living people
Members of the Executive Council of Ontario
Ontario Liberal Party MPPs
Politicians from Toronto
Toronto District School Board trustees
Members of the House of Commons of Canada from Ontario
Liberal Party of Canada MPs